Mian Tufail Mohammad (April 1914 – 25 June 2009) was a Pakistani religious leader, lawyer, Islamic theologian, and former Secretary General and Emir of Jamaat-e-Islami Pakistan party.

Early life and career
He was born in Kapurthala, Punjab, British India. He received his education and college degrees in Lahore. Then he became an active member of Jamaat-e-Islami Hind. Like Maulana Naeem Siddiqui, he also worked closely with Abul Aala Maududi.

Agitation for democracy
In 1965, the joint opposition against Ayub Khan was organised, he was one of its central leaders. Along with other leaders of the Combined Opposition Parties coalition, Mian Tufail toured both East Pakistan and West Pakistan to create mass awareness and organise a strong national democratic movement.

Books
Mian Tufail Mohammad co-authored with Abul A'la Maududi and Amin Ahsan Islahi the following books:
 Kashful Mahjub: An Urdu commentary
 Daw'at-e-Islami and Its Demands (Urdu)

Several biographies have been written on his life and work. The most prominent ones are the following:

 Mushahidaat (Urdu)
 " Tufail Nama"  (Urdu)
 " Tufail Qabila"  (Urdu)
 " Raah-e-Nijat"  (Urdu)

Death
On 7 June 2009, he had a brain haemorrhage. He was hospitalised at Shaikh Zayed Hospital in Lahore, Pakistan. After staying in a coma for over 2 weeks, he died on 25 June 2009 at the age of 95. Among his survivors were eight daughters and four sons.

Legacy

As one of the 75 founding members of Jamaat-e-Islami Hind, he will always be remembered in party history. His political legacy also descends down his family line. His son-in-law Ejaz Chaudhary is the Punjab president of Pakistan Tehreek-e-Insaf.

See also
 Naeem Siddiqui
 Mian
 Abdul Ghafoor Ahmed
 Khurshid Ahmad
 Muttahida Majlis-e-Amal
 Politics of Pakistan
 List of political parties in Pakistan

References

1914 births
2009 deaths
Jamaat-e-Islami Pakistan politicians
Political party founders
Pakistani Sunni Muslim scholars of Islam
20th-century Pakistani lawyers
Pakistani theologians
Pakistani Islamists
Pakistani democracy activists
People from Kapurthala
Lawyers from Lahore
Emirs of Jamaat-e-Islami Pakistan